The 2007 Dublin Senior Hurling Championship is a Dublin-based GAA club competition between the top clubs in Dublin Hurling. 'UCD GAA have elected not to participate in the Dublin SHC for 2007.' The first round of the 2007 championship was due to begin on August 28, 2007. However, these dates were put forward to mid September to accommodate for the Dublin players contesting the All-Ireland Under-21 Hurling Championship.

Quarter and Semi-finals

Group A 
The opening game of the tournament was the Group A clash between South Dublin and Faughs. Faughs won the game by 1-10 to 1-07 at Blunden Drive on September 13. In the second game of the opening round Lucan Sarsfields had a convincing win over Craobh which put them on top of the table after the first round. The second round saw Craobh return to lastyears form with a convincing 1-15 to 0-09 victory over Faughs.

Group B

Group C 
The first game of Group C between O'Tooles and Naomh Mearnóg was abandoned due to a problem with the floodlights.

Group D 
Kilmacud opened the 2007 Group D first round with a one-sided victory over Dublin South 2.

See also
 Dublin Senior Hurling Championship 2006
 Dublin Senior Hurling Championship 2009

References

External links
Official Dublin Website
Dublin on Hoganstand
Dublin Club GAA
Reservoir Dubs

Dublin Senior Hurling Championship
Dublin Senior Hurling Championship